The 2010–11 Elitserien season was AIK's 26th season in the Elitserien ice hockey league. It was AIK's first season in Elitserien since the 2001–02 Elitserien season. The regular season started on 15 September 2010 at home against Linköpings HC and ended on 5 March 2010 at home against Modo Hockey. The following playoffs ended on 27 March for AIK. The season followed AIK's re-establishment in Elitserien, Sweden's top ice hockey league.

AIK's first season in Elitserien in nine years was a major success. Despite expected by many hockey experts to be forced to play in the Kvalserien qualification for Elitserien, AIK managed to capture the 8th and last playoff spot. This meant that the team's first playoffs in ten years (the team qualified for the playoffs in the 2000–01 season) was true. The team finished the regular season with 76 points, which statistically was an Elitserien record for a newcomer. The team further surprised many in the playoffs when they beat regular season champions HV71 4–0 in the quarterfinals and thus advanced to the semifinals, where AIK met Färjestads BK, who ended up second in the regular season. However, Färjestad knocked out AIK in the semifinals, beating AIK 4–0.

Pre-season

Game log 
All times are local (CEST).

Regular season

Standings

Game log 

All times are local (CEST and CET).

Statistics

Players

Goaltenders

Playoffs

Game log

Statistics

Players

Goaltenders

Transactions

Final roster 

|}

Awards 
Honken Trophy: Viktor Fasth
Golden Puck: Viktor Fasth
Årets coach (Coach of the year): Roger Melin

References 

2010–11 Elitserien season
2010–11